Shivendra Bijoy Malla Deb (Bengali: শিবেন্দ্র বিজয় মল্ল দেব), known as Durgesh Da, is an Veteran Indian politician. He is from Jhargram, West Bengal.

Early life 
He was born in Kolkata on 11 November 1956 and belongs to the Royal family of Jhargram. He is the eldest grandson of Raja Narasingha Malla Deb and is an alumnus of Rajkumar College, Raipur and the prestigious St. Xavier's College, Kolkata.
He joined Indian Youth Congress as a college student when his father Birendra Bijoy Malla Deb was Member of Legislative Assembly from Jhargram.

Career 
He is currently the Mentor to Jhargram Municipality ,previously he had held the position of Mayor/Chairman -In-Council of Jhargram Municipality (ঝাড়গ্রাম পৌরসভা) from 2013 to 2022. Shivendra is elected Councillor of the No.14 Ward, Jhargram Municipality since 2003. He is the Vice President of the All India Trinamool Congress in Jhargram district.
Shivendra contested the 2006 West Bengal Legislative Assembly election from Jhargram, he was defeated by his nearest rival Amar Basu of Communist Party of India.
He was among the 11 Trinamool Congress political leaders in West Bengal who received threats from Maoists, hence he is provided with armed security by the West Bengal Home Department.

See also 
Pranab Basu

References 

1956 births
Living people
West Bengal politicians
Trinamool Congress politicians from West Bengal